Loyola Sullivan (born April 3, 1949) served as Canada's Ambassador for Fisheries Conservation from 2007 until 2011 and is a former Member of the House of Assembly in Newfoundland and Labrador. Sullivan represented the district of Ferryland from 1992 till 2006.

Sullivan was Leader of the Official Opposition between 1996 and 1998. When the Progressive Conservative (PC) Party came to power in 2003 he was appointed by Premier Danny Williams as the Minister of Finance and President of the Treasury Board and later as the Government House Leader.

Background

Early life and education
Loyola Sullivan was born on April 3, 1949 in Calvert, Newfoundland on the Southern Shore of the island of Newfoundland. Sullivan is the son of a fisherman and one of 12 children, who learned from an early age the importance of hard work; he started working summers in the local fish plant when he was 13 years old. He received his primary and elementary education in Calvert and attended high school in Ferryland where he graduated with honours at the top of his class. Sullivan attended Memorial University of Newfoundland (MUN) where he obtained Bachelor of Science degree in 1971 and Bachelor of Education degree in 1974.

Family and career
He is married to Verna Walsh of Fermeuse and together they have three children, Julie, Shelley and Stefan and three grandchildren. Sullivan became a high school biology, math and chemistry teacher, at Baltimore High School in Ferryland and was an owner and operator of two fish-processing operations as well as several other small businesses.

Volunteer work
Sullivan served as the Mayor of Fermeuse from 1979 to 1982 and was the President of the Southern Shore Arena Association from 1988 to 1991. Sullivan was also the Southern Shore Recreation Director, the coach of 12 provincial high school championships in cross-country, wrestling and hockey, as well as coaching the Newfoundland and Labrador junior wrestling team in the 1972 Canadian championship and Olympic trials.

Sullivan was a long-time member of the Kinsmen Club of Canada, rising to serve as National President of the organization in 1986. He served on a wide-variety of community committees and boards including the Regional Arena Association, the Southern Shore Athletic Association, the Regional Oil and Gas Impact Committee, and the Committee for Primary Health Care -A Nursing Model, for which he was recognized with the Canada Volunteer Award of Merit.

Politics

In opposition
Sullivan was first elected to the Newfoundland and Labrador legislature in a 1992 by-election and was subsequently re-elected in the next four general elections. From 1996 to 1998, he served as Leader of the Official Opposition and interim leader of the Progressivce Conservatives, taking over for Lynn Verge who had lost her seat in the 1996 general election. Sullivan did not lead the PC Party through an election campaign and was replaced as leader by Ed Byrne in 1998. During his time in Opposition he also served as Party Whip, Deputy House Leader, Chair of the Public Accounts Committee, and critic for Health, Education, Finance and Treasury Board.

In government
When the Progressive Conservatives formered the government after the 2003 general election Sullivan was appointed Minister of Finance and President of the Treasury Board. In that role, he led the negotiations for the 2005 Atlantic Accord and successfully secured the $2 billion agreement for the province. In 2006 he also took on the responsibility as Government House Leader, he served in both these roles till he retired from provincial politics in December 2006. The next month on January 25, 2007, Sullivan was appointed by the federal Ministers of Foreign Affairs and Fisheries and Oceans as Ambassador for Fisheries Conservation by the Government of Canada. Sullivan spent the four years furthering Canada's position on global fishery issues meeting with foreign fisheries ministers, ambassadors, foreign government and industry representatives to advance Canada's international fisheries agenda.

Federal politics
Sullivan announced on March 29, 2011, that he had resigned his post as Canada's Ambassador for Fisheries Conservation in order to seek the Conservative Party of Canada nomination in the riding of St. John's South-Mount Pearl for the 2011 federal election. On May 2, Sullivan placed third receiving 8,576 votes.

Electoral history 

|-

|-

|Liberal
|Andrea Kavanagh
|align="right"|504
|align="right"|8.39%
|align="right"|

|NDP
|Lois Martin
|align="right"|309
|align="right"|5.14%
|align="right"|

|Independent
|Pilar Riego-Hickey
|align="right"|11
|align="right"|0.18%
|align="right"|
|}

|-

|-

|Liberal
|H Mullowney
|align="right"|2141
|align="right"|31.62%
|align="right"|

|NDP
|G Ryan
|align="right"|147
|align="right"|2.17%
|align="right"|
|}

|-

|-

|Liberal
|T Best
|align="right"|2237
|align="right"|31.63%
|align="right"|
|}

|-

|-

|Liberal
|MC O'Brien
|align="right"|1125
|align="right"|22.65%
|align="right"|

|NDP
|V Silk
|align="right"|166
|align="right"|0.32%
|align="right"|
|}

References

External links

 Loyola Sullivan - Canada's Ambassador for Fisheries Conservation biography
 
 

1949 births
Living people
Progressive Conservative Party of Newfoundland and Labrador MHAs
Newfoundland and Labrador political party leaders
Mayors of places in Newfoundland and Labrador
Canadian diplomats
Conservative Party of Canada candidates for the Canadian House of Commons
Memorial University of Newfoundland alumni